To See the Next Part of the Dream is the second studio album by South Korean musician Parannoul. It was independently released on 23 February 2021. On 23 February 2022, a follow-up extended play titled White Ceiling / Black Dots Wandering Around was released to mark the album's one year anniversary, composed of B-sides not included on the initial album.

Background
As of May 2021, the person behind Parannoul remains anonymous, with none knowing their name, age, or whether the album was created with the help of any others. The text accompanying the album's release on Bandcamp includes Parannoul talking of themselves as an “active loser,” “below average in height, appearance and everything else,” with “singing skills [that] are fucking awful”. The album includes themes of nostalgia and contains many references to the culture of the early 2000s, such as Welcome to the N.H.K., Goodnight Punpun, and All About Lily Chou-Chou.

Critical reception

Grant Sharples of Consequence of Sound wrote that "Each song is its own exercise in catharsis, an instrumental foundation that gives Parannoul the liberty to drown their voice amidst the noise." Ian Cohen of Pitchfork stated: "The ambitious and alluring music expertly captures the feeling of a sound so uncannily familiar that it truly feels like a dream."

Track listing
All tracks written by Parannoul.

References

External links
 To See the Next Part of the Dream on Bandcamp

2021 albums
Parannoul albums
Korean-language albums
Emo albums
Lo-fi music albums